WPYB, Country, is a radio station in Benson, North Carolina—a small town between Raleigh and Fayetteville—that has a classic country music format.

WPYB was the first station that was owned by George G. Beasley, the founder of Beasley Broadcast Group. Beasley founded the station to cater to the black community in the Benson area, inspired by his commitment to provide a "voice for the voiceless" in his local community.

WPYB operates only during daylight hours to accommodate the signal of WBBR in New York City.

According to a listing in the SRDS Radio Advertising Source, Spring/Summer 2007, WPYB billed itself as "the best little station in the nation".

On May 1, 2021, WPYB was sold to McLamb Broadcasting for US$190,000.

References

External links
WPYB Website

PYB
Radio stations established in 1962
PYB